Enrique Pardo Farelo (1883-1965) was a Colombian novelist, poet and short story writer. He was also known by his pseudonym Luis Tablanca. Pardo Farelo was born in El Carmen and lived in Ocana, Norte de Santander in his youth. He was a co-founder of the journals Cromos and El Gráfico. Known for his short stories, his most important book was the critical work Una derrota sin batalla (A defeat without a fight). It was first published in 1935 and then reissued in 1983.

References

20th-century Colombian writers
1883 births
1965 deaths
People from Norte de Santander Department
20th-century Colombian poets
20th-century Colombian novelists
Colombian short story writers